The 2001–02 ABA season was the second season of the American Basketball Association. The regular season started in November 2001 and the year ended with the championship game in March 2002 featuring the Kansas City Knights and Southern California Surf. Kansas City defeated Southern California, 118-113 in the championship game to win their first ABA title.

Following the season, the league took a year off for reorganization. Play was picked up in the 2003 season.

Regular Season Standings

Postseason Results

References

American Basketball Association (2000–present) seasons
ABA